Antonis Kanakis (born Antonios Doumas (Αντώνιος Δούμας); 18 February 1969) is a Greek television host and an actor. He was born in Thessaloniki but has worked for many years in Athens. 

Kanakis is known for being one of the major participants in the TV satirical show A.M.A.N ta Katharmata together with Sotiris Kalivatsis and Giannis Servetas. He is now the key host of the parody show Radio Arvyla. He has also worked for the municipality-owned radio station of Thessaloniki, Kiss FM of Thessaloniki, ET3 channel, and Star Channel. In parallel with Radio Arvyla he takes part in a radio station Imagine.

References 

1969 births
Living people
Greek television presenters
Greek male television actors
People from Thessaloniki